The American Neurological Association (ANA) is a professional society of academic neurologists and neuroscientists devoted to advancing the goals of academic neurology; to training and educating neurologists and other physicians in the neurologic sciences; and to expanding both our understanding of diseases of the nervous system and our ability to treat them.  It was founded in June 1875.

See also 
 American Medical Association
 American Psychiatric Association
 Transactions of the American Neurological Association
 Sarah McNutt

References

External links 
 

Medical associations based in the United States
Neurology organizations
Organizations established in 1875
Medical and health organizations based in New Jersey